The long-tailed minivet (Pericrocotus ethologus) is a species of bird in the family Campephagidae. It is found in southern and south-eastern Asia where it occurs in Afghanistan, Bangladesh, Bhutan, China, India, Laos, Myanmar, Nepal, Pakistan, Thailand, and Vietnam. Its natural habitats are subtropical or tropical moist lowland forest and subtropical or tropical moist montane forest.

Gallery

References

long-tailed minivet
Birds of China
Birds of the Himalayas
Birds of Northeast India
Birds of Myanmar
Birds of Thailand
Birds of Vietnam
long-tailed minivet
Taxonomy articles created by Polbot